Cryptocoleopsis is a genus of liverworts belonging to the family Gymnomitriaceae.

The species of this genus are found in Russian Far East and Japan.

Species:
 Cryptocoleopsis imbricata Amakawa

References

Jungermanniales
Jungermanniales genera